Dr. John Bergsma is Professor of Theology at Franciscan University, in Steubenville, Ohio. He holds a Master of Theology degree from Calvin Theological Seminary, Grand Rapids, Michigan.  He also holds a Doctorate of Philosophy in Theology from the University of Notre Dame. His specialized study is that of the Old Testament and the Dead Sea Scrolls. He grew up as a Calvinist Protestant and served as a Protestant pastor for four years before converting to Catholicism in 2001.

Career
Dr. Bergsma's study of ancient scripture and the Dead Sea Scrolls have spawned multiple articles and publications, including his book The Jubilee from Leviticus to Qumran: A History of Interpretation. He has written several scholarly articles, some of which were co-authored by Catholic apologist and theologian Dr. Scott Hahn. Additionally, Dr. Bergsma has taken part in several seminars and discussions, including the Enoch seminar and that of the Jubilee. Dr. Bergsma routinely participates in lectures on his studies, and has contributed to media productions distributed by Lighthouse Catholic Media. With regard to the discovery and study of the Dead Sea Scrolls, his focus often includes how the scrolls reaffirm Catholic doctrine, tradition, and practices.

Books
 
 
 
 
 Psalm Basics for Catholics: Seeing Salvation History in a New Way. Ave Maria Press 2018. .
 With Brant Pitre A Catholic Introduction to the Bible: The Old Testament. Ignatius Press, 2018. .
 Jesus and the Dead Sea Scrolls: Revealing the Jewish Roots of Christianity. Image 2019. .

References

External links
 John Bergsma - Official Home Page
 Lighthouse Catholic Media

Converts to Roman Catholicism from Calvinism
Living people
1971 births
20th-century American Roman Catholic theologians
21st-century American Roman Catholic theologians